Pakistan Agricultural Storage & Services Corporation Ltd (PASSCO) is a Pakistani government-owned company working in the storage sector of Pakistan, under administrative control of Ministry of National Food Security and Research, Govt. of Pakistan. They are responsible for the storage of agricultural products from the whole country.

It was founded in 1973.

References

Pakistan federal departments and agencies
Government agencies established in 1973
1973 establishments in Pakistan